"I'm Over You" is a song written by Tim Nichols and Zack Turner, and recorded by American country music artist Keith Whitley.  It was posthumously released in January 1990 as the third single from the album I Wonder Do You Think of Me.  The song reached No. 3 on the Billboard Hot Country Singles & Tracks chart.

Content and history
I Wonder Do You Think of Me was Whitley's final studio album before his death from alcohol poisoning in 1989. "I'm Over You" was the album's third and final single, written by Tim Nichols and Zack Turner. It is composed in the key of F major, following a main chord pattern of F-B-F.

Cover versions
In 2010, country artist Chris Young released an acoustic cover version on his extended play Voices.

Charts

Weekly charts

Year-end charts

References

1990 singles
Keith Whitley songs
Chris Young (musician) songs
Songs written by Tim Nichols
Songs written by Zack Turner
Song recordings produced by Garth Fundis
RCA Records singles
Songs released posthumously
1989 songs